Hasseltia is a genus of flowering plants in the family Salicaceae. It contains four species of small to medium-sized trees native to the neotropics, ranging from Mexico south to Brazil and Bolivia. The genus is named for the Dutch physician and botanist Johan Conrad van Hasselt.

Hasseltia is unique among Salicaceae in that the species have pseudo-axile placentation, compound umbellate inflorescences, and a pair of glands embedded in the base of the leaf blades. Formerly placed in the heterogeneous family Flacourtiaceae, Hasseltia is now classified in Salicaceae, along with close relatives Pleuranthodendron and Macrothumia, with which they are commonly confused.

References

Salicaceae
Salicaceae genera
Flora of Central America
Flora of South America
Trees of Central America
Trees of South America